Aldergrove railway station is a former railway station which served the hamlet/townland of Aldergrove in County Antrim, Northern Ireland. It was south of Antrim, near RAF Aldergrove and Belfast International Airport.

History
The station was opened in 1871 by the Dublin and Antrim Junction Railway, which in 1879 became part of the Great Northern Railway (Ireland). In 1958 it passed to the Ulster Transport Authority, which withdrew passenger services from the line and closed the station in 1960.

Proposals
As of 2014, it was proposed that Aldergrove railway station could be reopened to serve Belfast International Airport. As the Lisburn–Antrim railway line is closed, plans for a station to serve the airport (a few hundred yards away) are aspirational. The Department for Regional Development Railway Investment Prioritisation Strategy stated in 2014 that a "re-opened Antrim to Knockmore/Lisburn line could also present an opportunity to establish a rail link to Belfast International Airport (BIA), although such investment is less likely to be economically viable until airport passengers grow to at least 10 million. Passenger throughput in 2013 was just 4 million. Given the important role of BIA as a gateway into Northern Ireland for tourism and inward investment, a feasibility study should be undertaken to consider investment in a rail link if passenger numbers grow towards 10 million by 2030 as predicted by the airport operator." By 2019, passenger numbers had grown to 6,278,563.

References 

 
 

Disused railway stations in County Antrim
Railway stations opened in 1871
Railway stations closed in 1960
1871 establishments in Ireland
1960 disestablishments in Northern Ireland
Railway stations in Northern Ireland opened in the 19th century